Sincerely may refer to:

Sincerity, the virtue of speaking truly about one's feelings, thoughts, desires

Music
Sincerely (Cliff Richard album), 1969
Sincerely (Dwight Twilley Band album) or the title song, 1976
Sincerely (The Emotions album) or the title song, 1984
Sincerely (The Forester Sisters album), 1988
Sincerely (Mari Hamada album)
Sincerely (Melody album) or the title song, 2004
Sincerely (Stephen album) or the title song, 2016
Sincerely, an album by the Clark Sisters, 1982
Sincerely, an album by Deb Talan, 2001
Sincerely, an album by End of a Year, 2006
"Sincerely" (song), a song written by Harvey Fuqua and Alan Freed, 1954
"Sincerely", a song by YoungBoy Never Broke Again from Sincerely, Kentrell

Other uses
"Sincerely", a valediction in written correspondence

See also
Sincerely Yours (disambiguation)